Call signs in Antarctica include a three letter region code and a series of numbers and letters.

Assignments for telecommunications

Assignments for amateur radio

Amateur radio or ham radio call signs are unique identifiers for licensed operators in Antarctica.  Call signs are regulated internationally by the ITU as well as nationally by governing bodies within each country who may have nationals operating in Antarctica.  Call signs may also be issued by a local Antarctic authority (i.e. base commander) who chooses from a block reserved by their national body for that purpose.  The Antarctic Treaty signed on December 1, 1959 (and entered into force on June 23, 1961), established the legal framework for the management of Antarctica, including allocation of amateur call signs.

The International Telecommunication Union does not assign call letter blocks to Antarctica since there is no single government there which can send delegates to ITU conferences.  However, some individual countries reserve Antarctic prefixes or call letters from within their own call letter blocks as per this table.  In some cases the assignment of call letters is made locally at an Antarctic base and the relevant national body is notified.

Reciprocal agreements

Although Antarctica is considered international by treaty, amateur radio operators in Antarctica are often subject to the reciprocal licensing requirements pertaining to the country under which the camp is flagged.

Special Events
The Worldwide Antarctic Program keeps a list of special event call signs issued from various countries at various times. TM4IPY was issued in 2007 by France to celebrate the International Polar Year as was IA0IPY, IA8IPY, IA7IPY & IP7IPY by Italy, GB4IPY by the United Kingdom, VY0ICE/VE2 in Canada, LZ07IPY in Argentina, EV5IPY in Belarus, CQ4IPY in Portugal, SN0IPY in Poland, YE2IPY in Indonesia, S50IPY in Slovenia, 5D0IPY in Morocco, and others.  These callsigns were used by amateurs in their home countries.

History of call sign allocation
The Worldwide Antarctic Program maintains current internet Bulletins as to call sign activity in the south polar region, including 3,100 call signs used since 1945.

 Australia – VK0 callsigns were used c. 1955 based on Antarctic treaties at the time.  Before that Macquarie Island and Antarctic area call signs were known as VK1.
 United States – prior to 1959 the FCC assigned KC4USx, McMurdo still uses KC4USV.  Since 1959, the FCC reserves callsigns in the block KC4AAA to KC4AAF for the National Science Foundation's use at the South Pole.  South Pole uses KC4AAA and Palmer uses KC4AAC.
 India – AT0A was used in 1983 for an expedition to Antarctica, as was AT3D and AT3ANT for a similar purpose from 1994 to 1996.
 USSR – The Union of Soviet Socialist Republics assigned '4K1' as its Antarctic prefix.  Upon the USSR's dissolution in 1991, this call fell within the Azerbaijani Republic's ITU allocation.  It is unclear if the Azerbaijani Republic still considers it as reserved for use by Antarctic stations.

Islands on the Air
The Radio Society of Great Britain assigns islands into seven world districts, including Antarctica.  It assigns IOTA Groups and Reference Numbers corresponding to these areas – Antarctic Islands are AN-xxx.  Some of these IOTA groups have call signs assigned by a sovereign power, others have call signs assigned according to the Antarctic Treaty.  Not all of these islands fall within the Antarctic Treaty area.

See also
 Call Sign
 ITU prefix – amateur and experimental stations
 Amateur radio license
 Telecommunications in Antarctica

References

Antarctica
Communications in Antarctica